The Middle-Danube Urnfield culture (c. 1300 BC – 800 BC) was a late Bronze Age culture of the middle Danube region.

See also
Urnfield culture

Bibliography
 Gedl, Marek (1985). Archeologia pierwotna i wczesnośredniowieczna, część III Epoka brązu i wczesna epoka żelaza w Europie, Drukarnia Uniwersytetu Jagielońskiego, Kraków.
  1999.

Urnfield culture
Archaeological cultures of Central Europe
Bronze Age cultures of Europe
Archaeological cultures in Austria
Archaeological cultures in Croatia
Archaeological cultures in the Czech Republic
Archaeological cultures in Hungary
Archaeological cultures in Slovakia
Archaeological cultures in Slovenia
Articles needing translation from Polish Wikipedia